Altaf Hussain (born 17 September 1953 in Karachi) is a British Pakistani politician who is known as the founder of the Muttahida Qaumi Movement. He holds United Kingdom citizenship and has been living in exile in the United Kingdom since the start of Operation Clean-up. Since 2015, he has been a fugitive from the Anti Terrorism Court of Pakistan on the charges of murder, targeted killings, treason, inciting violence and hate speeches. He is due to go on trial in the United Kingdom in January 2022 for promoting terrorism and unrest through hate speech in Pakistan. He fled the country in 1992 after a crackdown against his party was launched.

Early life
Altaf Hussain was born on 17 September 1953 to Nazir Hussain and Khurseed Begum in Karachi. Before the independence of Pakistan, Hussain's parents resided at their ancestral home in Nai ki Mandi, Agra, U.P., British India. His father was an officer with the Indian Railways. His paternal grandfather Mohammad Ramazan was the Grand Mufti of Agra and his maternal grandfather Pir Haji Hafiz Rahim Bakhsh Qadri was a religious scholar. Hussain's siblings include four sisters and six brothers.

Following the partition of India in 1947, a wide-scale migration of Muslims ensued, mostly from the various states in the Dominion of India to the newly established Dominion of Pakistan. Hussain's parents were initially reluctant to leave everything behind in Agra to resettle in Pakistan but were later forced by Hussain's elder brother to reconsider. Upon emigrating to Pakistan, the family settled in Karachi. They were provided with government housing in Abyssinia Lines reserved for muhajirs (people and families migrating from the Dominion of India).

Hussain's elder brother Nasir Hussain was later employed by the government and given a small quarter on Jehangir Road. The family subsequently left their government allotted residence and moved in with Nasir. The family later moved residence again in the 1970s to a small house in Azizabad, which later became the headquarters of Hussain's political party, the Muttahida Qaumi Movement (MQM;  Muhajir Qaumi Movement).

Education and non-political career

Hussain received his early education from the Government Comprehensive School in Azizabad. He later enrolled in the Government Boys Secondary School to complete his matriculation in 1969. For the first year of his intermediate education in pre-medical sciences, he attended the National College Karachi. He later moved to City College Karachi for his second year.

In 1974, Hussain graduated from the Islamia Science College with a Bachelor of Science. In 1979, he graduated from the University of Karachi with a Bachelor of Pharmacy. After graduating from the university, Hussain began his career as a trainee at the Seventh-day Adventist Hospital in Karachi while simultaneously working for a multinational pharmaceutical company.

Short-lived military service

In 1970, General Yahya Khan introduced the National Service Cadet Scheme (NSCS), making it compulsory for higher secondary scholars to enlist with the army. According to the MQM, Altaf Hussain enlisted with the Pakistan Army through the NSCS and his services were assigned to the 57th Baloch Regiment as soldier number 2642671. Upon completion of his training, his regiment was assigned from Hyderabad to Karachi from where it was sent to East Pakistan via ships.

Political career 

After 1971 Indo-Pak war came to an end, Hussain returned to West Pakistan to join wilfully with the regular army. In the version of events told by the MQM, the selection officer rejected Hussain's selection because his parents were 'muhajirs' from India even when Hussain insisted he was born in Pakistan. This is quoted as one of the many instances that formulated Hussain's future political aspirations.
The political strife of the All Pakistan Muhajir Students Organisation (APMSO) bifurcated into the issue of stranded Pakistanis in Bangladesh, and on 14 August 1979, Hussain participated in a demonstration at the Mazar-e-Quaid for the safe return of stranded Pakistanis, also called Biharis. Following the demonstration, Hussain was arrested and sentenced on 2 October 1979 to nine months imprisonment and flogging with five strokes. Hussain was later released on 28 April 1980 after he had served his sentence.

The urban centres of Karachi and Hyderabad had increasingly become ethnically diverse and riots along ethnic lines were commonplace. In May 1985, a Pathan minivan driver struck and killed a muhajir schoolgirl, inciting the first Pathan-Muhajir ethnic riot. Later, following an unsuccessful raid on an Afghan heroin processing and distribution centre in Sohrab Goth by the security forces, the Afghans attacked muhajir residents of Aligarh Colony.

The Aligarh Colony massacre instigated the bloody riots of November–December 1986. These riots saw the popularity of MQM and its leader Altaf Hussain rise and the party's ideology was greatly influenced as a result.

Before October 1986, the urban city of Hyderabad was largely dominated by the Sindhi nationalist party Jeay Sindh Qaumi Mahaz (JSQM) founded by G. M. Syed, giving rise to the nationalist slogan "Sindhu Desh" ("Sindhi nation"). The only Muhajir political movement countering the JSQM were led by Syed Mubarak Ali Shah of the Moti Mahal family, Nawab Zahid Ali Khan and Nawab Muzaffar Hussain. After the death of these Muhajir stalwarts, the Urdu-speaking people of Hyderabad yearned for a charismatic Muhajir leadership.

On 31 October 1986, Altaf Hussain gave his first public address in Hyderabad at the site of the historic Pacco Qillo, where he was greeted by throngs of crowds. After his address, his message was well received by the Urdu-speaking people of Hyderabad and Hussain was able to fill the void left by the deaths of Muhajir leaders. Hussain and a few of his companions were arrested by security personnel after his address, implicating him in several alleged criminal cases. His arrest enraged his supporters, who launched public movements for his release. The charges against Hussain and his companions were later dropped and they were released from the Central Prison Karachi on 24 February 1987.

In 1987 the government began widespread arrests of Mutahidda Qaumi Movement workers all over Sindh.  Altaf Hussain surrendered to law enforcement agencies on 30 August 1987 on the condition that the further arrests of his party's workers would be stopped immediately. During Hussain's imprisonment, MQM placed highly in the local bodies election of 1987, and there was pressure to release Hussain. He was released on 7 January 1988.

In early 1987, Altaf Hussain issued MQM's Charter of Resolutions (Qarardad-e-Maqasid), which formed the basis for the party's ideology. The MQM charter was paramount in expressing many of the "long-standing grievances" of Sindhi nationalists, and a cooperative arrangement was worked out between the MQM and various Sindhi nationalist parties in early 1988. Apart from the points stipulated in the party's original resolution, Hussain also introduced the idea of Muhajir being a "fifth subnationality" alongside the Punjabis, Pathans, Baloch, and Sindhis.

Altaf Hussain revealed that while he was admitted in Abbasi Shaheed Hospital in 1988, Late Hameed Gul (ISI chief at the time) a sent briefcase full of money through Brigadier (R) Imtiaz Ahmed and tried to bribe him in joining Pakistan military establishment led IJI coalition which was against PPP but he rejected the offer. Later both Brigadier (R) Imtiaz and Hameed Gul also confirmed the statement.

The 1988 general elections proved that the voting patterns in Sindh were based on ethnic lines, where the Pakistan Peoples Party and the MQM won almost all of the province's seats in the National Assembly. The PPP had derived its support from the Sindhi population in the province, and the MQM from the Muhajirs. At this point in time, in less than four years of its making, MQM emerged as the third-largest political party in Pakistan.

PPP had been successful in Sindh but didn't fare quite well in the other provinces; therefore having to resort to forming a coalition government. Hussain and his party MQM offered their support, but insisted on a formal agreement between the PPP and the MQM. This 59-point MQM-PPP accord, known as the Karachi Declaration, was signed on 2 December 1988. It reiterated many of the points defined in the earlier MQM charter. However, when Benazir Bhutto came into power, she was unwilling or unable to commit to her part of the bargain. Her reluctance in this matter was largely interpreted by muhajirs as pro-Sindhi and rather anti-Muhajir. When the declaration was not implemented, violence erupted between APMSO and the PSF, the student wings of the MQM and the PPP.

Shunned by Bhutto's disavowal, Altaf Hussain approached Nawaz Sharif, leader of the Islami Jamhoori Ittehad (IJI), in English "Islamic Democratic Alliance". The IJI was an opposition coalition eager to topple the Bhutto government. As a result of their meeting, a formal agreement between the MQM and the IJI came to pass. However, when Sharif later came into power, he couldn't honour those commitments either. Hussain became increasingly harsh and hostile in his opinions regarding the governing parties and would often accuse them of political hypocrisy. Seeing that striving for justice in a constitutional capacity was futile, ethnic militancy thrived. The gulf between Muhajirs and Sindhis widened, leading to several cases of "ethnic cleansing" in Hyderabad.
Hussain favours peace between India and Pakistan and has always been a vocal advocate of bridging gaps between the two neighbouring rivals.

Views

Seeking support from India
Altaf Hussain, while living in exile in the UK, has urged Indian Prime Minister Narendra Modi to grant him and his colleagues asylum in India or at least some financial assistance to take his case to the International Court of Justice.

Jammu and Kashmir
On the issue of Kashmir, Hussain stated that Indo-Pak dialogue should be allowed to "proceed on the basis of mutual adjustment and agreement...[and] It should be clear to all concerned that there can be no military solution to any of the contentious issues, let alone the issue of Kashmir."

Muhajir interests
Where much of the politics of Hussain's party MQM revolves around fighting for justice for the muhajir community in Pakistan, he claims that his party "[stands] for equal rights and opportunities for all irrespective of colour, creed, caste, sect, gender, ethnicity or religion". Hussain's party started out as a movement for the empowerment of muhajirs in Pakistan but later modified its underlying ideologies to reflect a more broader political scope by changing its name from "Muhajir Qaumi Movement" to "Muttahida Qaumi Movement".

Partition of India

He claims that the partition of India "was the division of blood, culture, brotherhood, relationships". 

He stated that the two-nation theory was concocted by the British Empire in order to destroy Hindu-Muslim unity. Hussain further claimed "When prophet Muhammad (peace be upon him) started preaching Islam and people entered Islam, people used to live in tribes and each tribe had its own identity but they were all Muslims believing in the oneness of Allah, embraced Quran as the only divine book and hence they were never one nation."

Stranded Pakistanis
Altaf Hussain has advocated for the government of Pakistan to assist those stranded Pakistanis, who are mostly of the Bihari ethnic group, to be safely repatriated to Pakistan.

Taliban
Altaf Hussain is a critic of the Taliban. Hussain, in 2008, warned against the Talibanisation of Karachi and stated that a "well planned conspiracy to intensify sectarian violence in the city, was being hatched."

Operation Clean-up, ban and other charges
The Pakistani government launched Operation Clean-up in 1992 and sent the military into Karachi to crack down on the MQM.  Hussain escaped Karachi one month before the operation began, following an attack on his life on 21 December 1991. Hussain fled to London and applied for political asylum.
In the later months of 1995, the political killings of members from both parties sparked an outcry throughout the city. This involved the killing of the younger brother of PPP's Syed Abdullah Shah, the Chief Minister of Sindh, which subsequently led to the killing of Altaf Hussain's 62-year-old brother Nasir Hussain and 27-year-old nephew Arif Hussain.
From 1993 to 1996, the port city of Karachi had become a political battleground between prime minister Benazir Bhutto's Pakistan People's Party and the Muhajir Qaumi Movement. In the wake of the ensuing political unrest, the MQM had remained vocal about the arbitrary arrests and extrajudicial killings of its members.

In 2015, The Lahore High Court banned his media coverage, with airing of his images and speeches banned across all electronic and print media. The Anti Terrorism Court of Pakistan declared him a fugitive on the charges of treason, inciting violence and hate speeches and sentenced him to 81 years in prison. In 2017, the Anti Terrorism Court of Pakistan issued non-bailable arrest warrants for Hussain in the murder case of Dr. Imran Farooq, who was a senior member of the MQM. Pakistan asked Interpol to issue a red warrant against Hussain but Interpol refused it by saying it does not "intervene in political and religious matters of a state".

It was reported that the Karachi police and the paramilitary Rangers force had arrested Nasir Hussain and his son from the Federal B area in Karachi on 4 and 6 December 1995, respectively. In a statement issued on 7 December 1995, the MQM blamed the government and the law enforcement agencies for the unlawful arrests of Nasir and Arif from their residence in Samanabad. On 9 December 1995, the badly mutilated corpses of both Nasir and Arif were found in an isolated area in Gadap Town in Karachi, from where they were taken to a nearby Edhi centre.

Altaf Hussain and other leaders of the MQM decried cases against him, which the party alleges were false politically motivated cases against the MQM in the back drop of the 1990s operation against them. In November 2009 all the cases were dropped under National Reconciliation Ordinance.

On 20 June 2013 the Metropolitan Police started a money laundering case against Altaf Hussain when it recovered some cash from his residence during a search. On 3 June 2014 he went to a police station for an interview. On 17 September 2016, Altaf Hussain's bail was cancelled for insufficient evidence. On 13 October 2016, Scotland Yard officially dismissed the money laundering case on the basis of lack of evidence.

Pakistan Tehreek-e-Insaf's chairman Imran Khan accused Altaf of inciting violence and soliciting murder in Karachi. In response, numerous complaints were filed with London Metropolitan Police against Altaf for inciting violence. Scotland Yard couldn't find any credible evidence in the incitement of violence case and subsequently dropped it.

On 11 June 2019, Hussain was detained by Scotland Yard in connection with a speech made on a 22 August 2016 under the Section 44 of the Serious Crime Act 2007 and was acquitted on 15 February 2022. Sattar, one of the senior members of the MQM in Pakistan, distanced himself from Hussain's statements following day and the London-based leadership and said they are not against Pakistan.

Since 2015, Hussain has been a fugitive from the Anti Terrorism Court of Pakistan on the charges of murder, targeted killings, treason, inciting violence and hate speeches. He fled the country in 1992 after a crackdown against his party was launched and since then is living in the United Kingdom. Scotland Yard maintains that sufficient evidence for the charges is lacking and the content of his speeches do not violate UK laws.

Personal life
Altaf Hussain married Faiza Gabol in 2001 and divorced in 2007. He has daughter named Afza Altaf born in 2002.

References

Citations

Cited sources

 
 
 
 
 
 
 
 
 

1953 births
Muttahida Qaumi Movement politicians
Naturalised citizens of the United Kingdom
Pakistani political party founders
Fugitives wanted by Pakistan
Muhajir people
Pakistani prisoners and detainees
Research and Analysis Wing activities in Pakistan
Pakistan Army personnel
Living people
Pakistani exiles
Pakistani emigrants to the United Kingdom
Politicians from Karachi
University of Karachi alumni